In mathematics, a shear matrix or transvection is an elementary matrix that represents the addition of a multiple of one row or column to another. Such a matrix may be derived by taking the identity matrix and replacing one of the zero elements with a non-zero value.

The name shear reflects the fact that the matrix represents a shear transformation. Geometrically, such a transformation takes pairs of points in a vector space that are purely axially separated along the axis whose row in the matrix contains the shear element, and effectively replaces those pairs by pairs whose separation is no longer purely axial but has two vector components. Thus, the shear axis is always an eigenvector of S.

Definition

A typical shear matrix is of the form

This matrix shears parallel to the x axis in the direction of the fourth dimension of the underlying vector space.

In matrix form:

In matrix form:

In 3D space this matrix shear the YZ plane into the diagonal plane passing through these 3 points:    

The determinant will always be 1, as no matter where the shear element is placed, it will be a member of a skew-diagonal that also contains zero elements (as all skew-diagonals have length at least two) hence its product will remain zero and will not contribute to the determinant. Thus every shear matrix has an inverse, and the inverse is simply a shear matrix with the shear element negated, representing a shear transformation in the opposite direction. In fact, this is part of an easily derived more general result: if S is a shear matrix with shear element , then Sn is a shear matrix whose shear element is simply n. Hence, raising a shear matrix to a power n multiplies its shear factor by n.

Properties
If S is an n × n shear matrix, then:
 S has rank n and therefore is invertible
 1 is the only eigenvalue of S, so det S = 1 and trace S = n
 the eigenspace of S (associated with the eigenvalue 1) has n−1 dimensions.
 S is defective
 S is asymmetric
 S may be made into a block matrix by at most 1 column interchange and 1 row interchange operation
 the area, volume, or any higher order interior capacity of a polytope is invariant under the shear transformation of the polytope's vertices.

Composition

Two or more shear transformations can be combined.

then their composition matrix is

which also has determinant 1, so that area is preserved.

In particular, if , we have

which is a positive definite matrix.

Applications
 Shear matrices are often used in computer graphics.

See also
Transformation matrix

Notes

References
 

Matrices
Linear algebra
Sparse matrices